The Slieve Felim Mountains are a mountain range in Munster, Ireland. They cover parts of County Limerick and County Tipperary. Historically, the name "Slieve Felim" meant the whole mountainous area between Murroe, Silvermines, Borrisoleigh and Dundrum, including the Silvermine Mountains and Mauherslieve. However, today the name usually only applies to the southwestern part, made up of Slieve Felim, Cullaun, Knockastanna and Gortnageragh.

Sliabh Eibhlinne means "mountains of Ébliu", an ancient goddess. In the Lebor Gabála Érenn (The Book of the Taking of Ireland), the newly-arrived Milesians meet the goddess Fódla on these mountains, and she asks them to name the island after her. Fódla thus became a poetic name for Ireland. In the early modern era, the name Eibhlinne became confused with the more common male name Féilim, and so the mountains became known in English as Slieve Felim.

Slieve Felim Way
The Slieve Felim Way is a long-distance trail through the Mountains. It is designated as a National Waymarked Trail by the National Trails Office of the Irish Sports Council and is managed by Shannon Development and Coillte. The trail begins in the village of Murroe and follows the road past Glenstal Abbey before crossing forestry along the slopes of the Slieve Felim Mountains to reach the village of Toor. From Toor, the Way crosses the flanks of Keeper Hill in the Silvermine Mountains before following the road into Silvermines village.

References

Mountains and hills of County Limerick